Plamen Nikolov - Patso (born 24 June 1957 in Pleven) is a former Bulgarian football defender.

Club career
In his career Nikolov played mostly for PFC Levski Sofia. In 1984, he was named Bulgarian Footballer of the Year.  He was a successful player in the Swedish top division when playing for IK Brage. Between the seasons in Sweden (where they play spring-fall) he was on loan to Antwerpen and Vitosha Levski. After his retirement, he worked as assistant manager of Levski Sofia as well as head coach of Spartak Pleven, Olympik Teteven and Botev Vratsa.

International career
For Bulgaria, Nikolov was capped 55 times, making his debut on 22 February 1978 against Scotland.

Awards
 Champion of Bulgaria: 1979, 1984, 1985, 1988
 Bulgarian Cup: 1979, 1982, 1984, 1991

References

External links
 
 Profile - FC Antwerp
 Profile at LevskiSofia.info
 Internationella Brage ikbrage.se

1957 births
Living people
Bulgarian footballers
Bulgaria international footballers
Association football defenders
PFC Spartak Pleven players
PFC Levski Sofia players
IK Brage players
Royal Antwerp F.C. players
First Professional Football League (Bulgaria) players
Bulgarian expatriate sportspeople in Sweden
Sportspeople from Pleven